"Redbone" is a song recorded by American rapper and singer Childish Gambino, the stage name of Donald Glover. It was released on November 17, 2016, and serves as the second single from his third studio album "Awaken, My Love!" The song received three Grammy Award nominations including Record of the Year at the 60th Annual Grammy Awards, eventually winning the award for Best Traditional R&B Performance.
In 2021, it was ranked #383 on Rolling Stone magazine's list of the 500 Greatest Songs of All Time.

Background
Following the release of "Me and Your Mama", Gambino released the song on November 17, 2016, premiering on Annie Mac's Hottest Record on BBC Radio 1, with the DJ describing it as "oozing with soul".

Recording and production
"Redbone" was written by Donald Glover and produced by Ludwig Göransson. When Glover was doing an interview with Triple J about the album he said:

Göransson recorded all the instruments starting out from a drum beat that Donald Glover was playing. The intro of the song is dominated by a recurrent slap bass line and the Maestro G-2 wah of a vintage Telecaster that plays the melody while a synth organ makes the counterpoint. An old Rhodes conduct the base chords in D minor as other instruments get in, like a clavinet, a mellotron, a glockenspiel and the Juno-106 synthesizer. The outro part ends with several fuzz guitar harmony licks, a doubled distorted acoustic guitar and some classic piano arrangements. The song is based on "I'd Rather Be with You" by Bootsy's Rubber Band.

Critical reception 
Redbone was critically acclaimed upon release, resulting in its inclusion in several publications’ year-end best songs lists. Critics primarily praised the track as a faithful homage to P-Funk and 70’s R&B, as well as for Glover's vocals. In a positive review, Pitchfork’s Sheldon Pearce called the track “a full-blown funk slow jam” which “parses love, lust, reconciliation, generations of black soul, and wokeness”. Slant Magazine, which ranked the song as the Best Single of 2017, described it as “a creepin’ tribute to the pre-quiet-storm R&B characterized by the Delfonics and the Floaters” and highlighted the “Thundercat-worthy popping bassline” and “insistent glockenspiel diddling strike”. Jonathan Wroble at Slant took note of the song’s “wah-wah guitar and slap bass, distant chimes, and pitch-shifted vocals”, calling them “robotic and soulful at once”. Jason Woodbury of Flood Magazine compared the song to “Prince’s erudite R&B” and called Glover’s falsetto singing “remarkable”. NME ranked the song 14th in its Best Songs of the Decade list, noting Glover’s “bold reinvention as a 70s soul’n’funk crooner” and that his singing “incredibly, wasn’t pitch-shifted in the studio”. Editors from Rolling Stone included the track in the publication’s 100 Greatest Songs of the Century So Far list in 2018, stating that it distilled the spirit of “that Seventies black music that felt like they were trying to start a revolution”.

Commercial performance
"Redbone" was a sleeper hit in the United States, debuting at number 75 on Billboard Hot 100 for the chart dated December 10, 2016. The song then re-entered and peaked at number 12 on the chart for the week of August 19, 2017, making it Gambino's highest-charting single at the time (since surpassed by "This Is America") and his first top 20 single. The song became Childish Gambino's first ever number-one single on the Adult R&B chart.

The track was voted into fifth place in Australian radio station Triple J's Hottest 100 of 2016.

Usage in media
The 2017 film Get Out, directed by Jordan Peele, features the song during the film's opening scene.

The song became a popular internet meme, following its re-entry to the Billboard charts, consisting of various remixes of the song to fit a certain theme. During a concert in June 2017, Glover acknowledged the meme onstage before leading into a performance of the song.

During the 2018 Grammy Awards, an Apple ad showing off iPhone X's Animoji effect aired, in which the song was used, with an animated alien head singing the song.

Personnel
Childish Gambino – lead and backing vocals, drums
Ludwig Göransson –  Fender Rhodes, synthesizers, mellotron, clavinet, bass guitar, electric guitar, acoustic guitar, glockenspiel, additional vocals

Charts

Weekly charts

Year-end charts

Certifications

References

External links

2016 singles
2016 songs
Donald Glover songs
Glassnote Records singles
Grammy Award for Best Traditional R&B Vocal Performance
Internet memes introduced in 2017
Songs about infidelity
Songs written by Ludwig Göransson
Songs written by Donald Glover
2010s fads and trends
Viral videos